Nikolas Tsakos (born 1963) is a Greek shipowner. He is the Founder, President and CEO of Tsakos Energy Navigation (TEN) Limited, a pioneering company which is the longest established Greek shipping public listing. He was the former chairman of the International Association of Independent Tanker Owners from 2014 to 2018.

Early life
Nikolas P. Tsakos comes from a traditional Chian shipping family. He has been involved in the maritime industry since 1981 and has spent a total of two years at sea.  From 1982 to 1985, he was Shipping and Operations Manager of Tsakos Shipping and Trading Ltd in the US with a focus on the off-shore energy sector in Central America and the U.S. Gulf.

He received his BA Degree in Economics and Political Science from Columbia University in 1985 and his master's degree in Shipping Trade and Finance from the City University Business School in London in 1987. Nikolas P. Tsakos served as an officer in the Hellenic Navy in 1988. He is married to prominent Greek fashion designer Celia Kritharioti and he has three children.

Career
TEN, the company he founded, was firstly listed on the Oslo Bors in 1993 and is listed in the New York Stock Exchange (NYSE symbol: TNP) since March 2002. In December 2015 TEN owned and operated a fleet of 48 product and crude oil tankers on charter to national, major and other independent oil companies and refiners under long, medium and short-term charters, including one 2007-built Liquefied Natural Gas ("LNG") carrier and two 2013-built DP2 shuttle suezmax tankers.

Distinctions & Awards
Nikolas P. Tsakos was awarded in 2015 the Lloyd's List Greek Shipping Newsmaker of the Year award. In 2011, he received an honorary doctorate from the City University Business School, for his pioneering work in the equity financial markets relating to shipping companies. He has also received the following awards: "Lloyd’s List award for the Best Tanker operator in 2006”, “EUROPE’s 500 award in 2005, “ Lloyd's List award to HELMEPAfor achievement for clean and safe seas in 2004” and “Best Maritime Manager of the New Generation” award by the magazine “ Business Administration Bulletin” at the Academy of Athens.

Philanthropy
Nikolas P. Tsakos is the Co-Founder together with Cpt. Panagiotis N. Tsakos of the Maria Tsakos Foundation (named after his late sister), a charitable organization for the well being and education of young, talented men and women focusing on maritime studies and tradition.

Membership
Nikolas P. Tsakos is an active member of the following organizations: 
	Independent Tanker Owners Organization (INTERTANKO),Chairman (2014–Present), Vice Chairman (2012-2014), Executive Committee member (2009–Present), Council member (1992–Present) 
	Korean Register (KR) Hellenic Committee, Chairman (2014–Present)
	UK P&I Club, board member (2006–Present)
       American Bureau of Shipping(ABS), council member (2004 – Present)
	Union of Greek Shipowners (UGS), board member (2003–Present)
	Hellenic Marine Environment Protection Association (HELMEPA), ex-Chairman. (2002 - 2006)
	Greek Committee of Det Norske Veritas (DNV), council member (1999–Present)
       Bureau Veritas, council member
       Greek Shipping Co-operation Committee, council member

See also 
 Greek shipping

Notes

External links 
 Tsakos Energy Navigation Celebrates Five Years on the NYSE (PR Newswire)
 Tsakos Energy Navigation site. 
 March 29, 2007 delivery of the 105,000 dwt new-design Aframax IZUMO PRINCESS from Sumitomo Heavy Industries of Japan 

1963 births
Living people
Greek businesspeople in shipping
Businesspeople from Chios
Columbia College (New York) alumni
Alumni of Bayes Business School
People named in the Paradise Papers